Sidney Schofield (7 February 1883 – 24 March 1956) was a British racewalker. He competed in the 10 mile walk at the 1908 Summer Olympics.

References

External links
 

1883 births
1956 deaths
British male racewalkers
Olympic athletes of Great Britain
Athletes (track and field) at the 1908 Summer Olympics
People from Long Melford